The Serbs of Zagreb ( / ) are a traditional minority group that lives in the Croatian capital Zagreb.

History

Serbs became equal citizens of Zagreb in 1781 after Emperor Francis II released an edict named Patent of Toleration.

Religious life
Zagreb is the seat of the Metropolitanate of Zagreb, Ljubljana and all Italy. In addition to this there is also the Monastery of Saint Parascheva of the Balkans

Secular life
There are more prominent Serbs who participated in the social life of the city and among them may be enumerated the following.
In 1834 Hristifor Stanković, president of the Zagreb Orthodox Church municipality, built the first theater in Gradec. Poet Petar Preradović was a prominent participant of the Illyrian movement after whom today one of the city squares is named. Banker Atanas Popović was one of the founders of First Croatian Savings Bank whose successor today is Privredna banka Zagreb. Father of Dejan Medaković, Bogdan Medaković was the Speaker of the Croatian Parliament from 1913 till 1918.

Organizations
In Zagreb, there are several institutions of the Serbian national minority: Prosvjeta, Serb Democratic Forum, Privrednik, Serb National Council, and Serbian Orthodox Secondary School. There is also the Central Library of Serbs in Croatia as part of Prosvjeta, Tesla Bank, Metropolitanate of Zagreb, Ljubljana and all Italy which maintains the Choral Society and Museum. Every year since 2006 there are held days of Serbian culture. Weekly Novosti and monthly magazine Identitet are published in Zagreb.

Notable individuals
Kantakuzina Katarina Branković (1418–1492)
Petar Preradović (1818–1872)
Đuro Daničić (1825–1882)
Vladan Desnica (1905–1967)
Dejan Medaković (1922–2008)

See also
Serbs of Croatia
Zagreb

References

Sources

External links
http://www.snv.hr/
http://www.danisrpskekulture.com/

History of the Serbs of Croatia
Serb communities in Croatia
History of Zagreb
Zagreb